Helje Solberg (born 7 March 1967) is a Norwegian journalist.

She was born in Elverum, and graduated as cand.mag. from the University of Oslo in 1993. She has been a journalist for the newspapers Østlendingen,  Sør-Varanger Avis, Nationen and Verdens Gang (from 1994). She was appointed editor in Verdens Gang from 2005 to 2014, and editor and director of VGTV from 2014.

Solberg was awarded the SKUP Award in 1995, for revealing the Workers' Youth League affair through investigative journalism.

Her books include Karen - en historie om alzheimer from 1996. She is a boardmember of the Norwegian Media Businesses' Association from 2013.

References

1967 births
Living people
People from Elverum
Norwegian journalists
University of Oslo alumni
Verdens Gang people
Norwegian investigative journalists